Papyrius nitidus is a species of ant in the genus Papyrius. Endemic to Australia and New Guinea, it was described by Mayr in 1862.

References

Dolichoderinae
Hymenoptera of Australia
Insects of New Guinea
Insects described in 1862